Kim Dongwoo (born February 5, 1988) is a South Korean football player who plays for Suwon FC.

External links
 

1988 births
Living people
Association football central defenders
South Korean footballers
FC Seoul players
Ansan Mugunghwa FC players
Daegu FC players
Jeju United FC players
K League 1 players
K League 2 players
Sportspeople from Jeju Province